Sultan Mohammed Said Al-Touqi commonly known as Sultan (born 2 January 1984) is an Omani former footballer who played as a midfielder. He was capped 19 times by the Oman national team.

International career
Sultan was selected for the Oman national football team for the first time in 2004. He has made appearances in the 2006 FIFA World Cup qualification, the 2007 Gulf Cup of Nations and the 2007 AFC Asian Cup qualification and has represented the national team in the 2004 AFC Asian Cup qualification, the 2004 AFC Asian Cup, the 2007 AFC Asian Cup and the 2011 AFC Asian Cup qualification. He was a favorite of former Oman manager Milan Macala, who regularly used him in the Oman national team's midfield. Sultan Al-Touqi was an unsung hero of Oman's golden generation. Al-Touqi has great passing ability and has great off the ball movement. Injury has hampered his career, but he remains one of the best midfielders Oman has ever produced. Sultan Al-Touqi scored against the Yemen at the 2007 Gulf Cup and he had a powerful shot blocked by the UAE goalkeeper in the final of that same tournament. Sadly for Al-Touqi and Oman, the UAE ended up beating Oman in that final match 1-0 and they won the Gulf Cup.

National team career statistics

Goals for Senior National Team

References

External links
 
 
 Sultan Al-Touqi at Goal.com
 
 

1984 births
Living people
Omani footballers
Oman international footballers
Omani expatriate footballers
Association football midfielders
2004 AFC Asian Cup players
2007 AFC Asian Cup players
Muscat Club players
Al Salmiya SC players
Al-Shamal SC players
Al-Shabab SC (Seeb) players
Suwaiq Club players
Saudi Professional League players
Qatar Stars League players
Expatriate footballers in Kuwait
Omani expatriate sportspeople in Kuwait
Expatriate footballers in Qatar
Omani expatriate sportspeople in Qatar
Footballers at the 2006 Asian Games
Asian Games competitors for Oman
People from Ash Sharqiyah North Governorate
Al-Shabab SC (Kuwait) players
Kuwait Premier League players
Qadsia SC players